Interstate 395 (I-395) is an auxiliary Interstate Highway in the US states of Connecticut and Massachusetts; it is maintained by the Connecticut Department of Transportation (CTDOT) and the Massachusetts Department of Transportation (MassDOT). The  section between its splits from I-95 in East Lyme and Connecticut Route 695 in Plainfield is a component highway of the Connecticut Turnpike. Within that state, the highway is named the American Ex-Prisoner of War Memorial Highway from Plainfield to Thompson.

The highway was first established as part of the Connecticut Turnpike in 1958, while the Connecticut Route 52 designation was applied to the portion north of the turnpike in 1967. Connecticut Route 52 was intended to become a southern extension of I-290, although the current designation of I-395 was ultimately assigned in 1983.

Route description

|-
|
|
|-
|
|
|-
|Total
|
|}

Connecticut

I-395 begins at the East Lyme–Waterford town line as the Connecticut Turnpike leaves I-95 as the latter route turns more easterly toward New London. It is a relatively rural Interstate for most of its length. It passes through Waterford into Montville where it meets Route 2A at exit 9. Eastbound Route 2A provides access to the Mohegan Sun casino, while westbound Route 2A runs concurrently with I-395 into Norwich and ends at exit 13, where it terminates as it joins its parent route, Route 2. After passing Route 2, I-395 bends to the east, and continues into Lisbon, Griswold, and Plainfield, where it bends more northerly and parallels Route 12 for most of the rest of its length. At the Plainfleld–Killingly town line, the Connecticut Turnpike splits to the east as unsigned Route 695, providing access to US Route 6 (US 6) at the Rhode Island state line. I-395 continues north and meets US 6 in Killingly. After crossing into Putnam, it has an interchange with US 44. It then passes through Thompson before crossing the Massachusetts state line into Webster.

Massachusetts
After passing through Webster and Oxford, it enters Auburn where it has an interchange with US 20, which provides access to the Route 146 expressway. The I-395 designation for the highway ends as it meets I-90 (Massachusetts Turnpike) at exits 11A and 11B and becomes I-290 as it heads toward Worcester, although the mileage for I-395 runs in parallel with its I-290 counterpart until it reaches I-495 in Marlborough.

Service plazas

In Connecticut, there are three service plazas (a legacy of the turnpike) that provide 24-hour gas stations, convenience stores, plus a Subway and Dunkin' Donuts.

Montville (milepost 8): It is southbound only between exits 9 and 6.
Plainfield (milepost 35): It is northbound and southbound between exits 32 and 35.

The Connecticut State Police Troop E barracks occupies the former service plaza on the northbound side at Montville.

History

The highway that is now I-395 from its southern terminus with I-95 in East Lyme to exit 35 in Plainfield opened on January 2, 1958, as part of the  Connecticut Turnpike from Greenwich at the New York state line to Killingly at the Rhode Island state line. In 1964, work began on a freeway extension beyond the turnpike in Plainfield north toward Worcester, connecting to the Massachusetts Turnpike (I-90). This new freeway, as well as the existing section of the Connecticut Turnpike from East Lyme to Plainfield, would be designated as Connecticut Route 52. The section between Plainfield and US 44 near Putnam opened in 1967, and the section from US 44 to the Massachusetts state line opened in 1969. Massachusetts completed its section of the freeway in 1977.

In 1983, in response to the cancelation of the proposed I-84 extension from Hartford to Providence, CTDOT wished to supplement the state's loss of Interstate mileage by applying an Interstate designation to Connecticut Route 52. Initially, I-290 was to be extended from its southern terminus in Auburn, Massachusetts. However, in 1983, it was decided to instead apply the I-395 designation to the freeway south of I-90.

In May 2013, CTDOT announced that a project that would begin in early 2014 that included renumbering exits along its section of I-395, and Connecticut Route 2A from the then-current sequential numbering system to a distance-based scheme to conform with federal exit numbering standards. During the transition, old exit numbers were posted atop the new exit numbers through 2017 to lessen any confusion. The renumbering began on June 24, 2015, and ended in January 2016; the project included renumbering one sign in Massachusetts announcing the first southbound Connecticut exit.

Exit list
Exit numbers were changed from sequential to distance-based numbering in Connecticut between July and December 2015. Along with Connecticut Route 2A, these are Connecticut's initial distance-based exit numbers. MassDOT also planned to switch exit numbers on all of its Interstates, including I-395, to distance-based numbering in 2016. But the contract to change exit numbers which was to be awarded in December 2015 was indefinitely postponed in the middle of 2016. It was not until November 18, 2019, that MassDOT confirmed that beginning in late summer 2020 the exit renumbering project will begin. On July 29, 2021, MassDOT announced that the exit renumbering on I-395 and I-290 will start on August 8, and it will last for two weeks.

References

External links

Kurumi - I-395 Connecticut; Massachusetts

95-3 Connecticut
3 Connecticut
95-3
95-3
Transportation in New London County, Connecticut
Transportation in Windham County, Connecticut
Transportation in Worcester County, Massachusetts